Punky Brewster is an American television series created by David W. Duclon. The series revolves around a girl named Punky Brewster (Soleil Moon Frye) being raised by her foster parent Henry Warnimont (George Gaynes). The show aired original episodes on NBC from September 16, 1984, to March 9, 1986, and again in first-run syndication from October 30, 1987, to May 27, 1988.

In the early part of season one, six fifteen-minute episodes were produced because the show had many young viewers and was scheduled after football games, which tended to run overtime. This was done rather than joining a full-length episode in progress, because that would disappoint children watching the program, and showing it later tended to put them up at a time parents may have considered too late for their children.

Series overview

Episodes

Season 1 (1984–85)

Season 2 (1985–86)

Season 3 (1987)
While the show was in production throughout the 1986–87 season, it did not return to the air via first-run syndication until October 30, 1987. Beginning on that premiere date, Punky Brewster was packaged such that new episodes would air once every weekday (usually late in the afternoon on independent stations). The entire third season (1986–87) aired in the five-days-a-week format through December 7, 1987. The following Monday, reruns of the third season took over on weekdays, while the episodes shot during the 1987–88 season were completing. On April 27, 1988, new episodes resumed for the fourth season, and ran every weekday for exactly a month until the series finale aired on Friday, May 27, 1988.

Season 4 (1988)

References

Punky Brewster